Natriuretic peptide receptor C/guanylate cyclase C (atrionatriuretic peptide receptor C), also known as NPR3, is an atrial natriuretic peptide receptor. In humans it is encoded by the NPR3 gene.

Function 

The family of natriuretic peptides elicit a number of vascular, renal, and endocrine effects that are important in the maintenance of blood pressure and extracellular fluid volume. These effects are mediated by specific binding of the peptides to cell surface receptors in the vasculature, kidney, adrenal, and brain.

See also
 Atrial natriuretic peptide receptor

References

Further reading

External links